Gibbomesosella nodulosa is a species of beetle in the family Cerambycidae. It was described by Maurice Pic in 1932. It is known from Vietnam.

References

Pteropliini
Beetles described in 1932